Will Any Gentleman...? is a 1953 British comedy film directed by Michael Anderson and starring George Cole, Veronica Hurst Heather Thatcher, Jon Pertwee, and William Hartnell. It was based on a 1950 play of the same name by Vernon Sylvaine. It was made at Elstree Studios with sets designed by the art director Terence Verity and shot in Technicolor by cinematographer Erwin Hillier. It was the first of five movies Michael Anderson made for ABPC and was reasonably successful at the box office.

It is notable for featuring both William Hartnell and Jon Pertwee onscreen together. Both actors would later go on to play The Doctor in Doctor Who.

Synopsis
Henry Sterling, a mild-mannered bank clerk, visits a music hall to pay the manager a debt owed by his cheque-bouncing philandering brother. He is persuaded to stay and become the subject of a stage hypnotist, The Great Mendoza. Fleeing back home, he cannot remember where he's been and what he's done.

His now-twin personas come and go at random. When in the hypnotised state, he becomes very reckless, both in chatting up women he would never normally dare approach, and spending money he has not got.

After he insults his domineering mother-in-law, his wife leaves him. He robs his boss of £300, but his brother realises what has happened and persuades the hypnotist to get him back to normal.

Cast

 George Cole as Henry Sterling
 Veronica Hurst as Florence Sterling
 Heather Thatcher as Mrs. Whittle
 Jon Pertwee as Charley Sterling
 James Hayter as Dr. Smith
 William Hartnell as Detective Inspector Martin
 Sid James as Mr. Hobson
 Diana Decker as Angel
 Joan Sims as Beryl
 Brian Oulton as Mr. Jackson
 Alan Badel as The Great Mendoza
 Wilfred Boyle as Albert Boyle
 Alexander Gauge as Mr. Billing
 Jill Melford as Honey
 Josephine Douglas as Doctor's Receptionist
 Diana Hope as 	Blonde In Bank
 Martin Wyldeck as Commissionaire
 Richard Massingham as 	Stout Man
 Peter Butterworth as Theatre stage manager
 Wally Patch as Bookmaker
 Frank Birch as 	Mr. Brown
 Arthur Howard as Mr. Coding
 Lionel Jeffries as 	Mr. Frobisher
 Brian Wilde as Clerk
 Nan Braunton as Neighbour
 Lucy Griffiths as Blonde Outside Bank
 Harry Herbert as Stage Door Keeper
 Russ Allen as 	Sporty Type
 	Philo Hauser as 	Acrobat in Dressing Room
 Jean Marsh as 	Dancer

Critical reception
The New York Times wrote, "Although the British movie makers have been known to make the most of humor, their infrequent lapses in this genre can be deadly dull. And Will Any Gentleman . . . ?, the farce by that cryptic title, which landed at the Plaza yesterday, falls flatly into the latter niche...All that may be said of Michael Anderson, a young and respected director, is that he has kept his cast, if not his story, moving. George Cole is largely bewildered and woebegone as the transformed bank teller. Jon Pertwee, who looks a bit like Danny Kaye, adds an occasional comic touch as his energetic, scapegrace brother....As the film's confused detective, William Hartnell delivers the script's most ambitious line when he says, "there's something funny going on around here!" ; while more recently, Cineoutsider described the film as "an adaptation that manages to maintain a certain level of energy throughout its running time. Although the main premise may be a little tired, the witty dialogue and superb acting keep the pace up despite the stilted direction and the occasional dud routine. For the most part its essentially filmed theatre, but that is no reason for it to be dismissed out of hand."

References

External links 
 

1953 films
1953 comedy films
Films shot at Associated British Studios
1950s English-language films
Films directed by Michael Anderson
British comedy films
Films shot in London
Films set in London
British films based on plays
1950s British films